Kye Ung-sang Universityalso known as  Kye Ung-sang Sariwon University of Agriculture is a university in Sariwon, North Korea.

History
The university was initially founded as the Sariwon University of Agriculture on September 1, 1959. The university changed its name to its current name in 1990, after the North Korean geneticist Kye Ung-sang, an expert in silkworms. In May 2010, the university along with Pyongyang Medical College, and Pyongyang Agricultural College were made into elements of the Kim Il Sung University Council, however, those three institutions seceded were later removed in October 2019.

Works
During the 60th anniversary of its founding,a reporting event of its scientific technological achievements in the national agriculture department was held in September. In 2021, it was published in DPRK Today that the university's mechanical agricultural department has developed seed selection machines for wheat and barley and different kinds of complex fertilizers, along with machines for silkworm gender determinations.

Notable alumni

 Xing Haiming, Chinese ambassador to South Korea

References

Universities in North Korea